Alma de bronce is a 1944 Mexican film. It stars Carlos Orellana.

Cast

Pedro Armendáriz		
José Baviera		
Narciso Busquets		
Chela Castro		
Conchita Gentil Arcos		
Carlos Martínez Baena		
Gloria Marín		
Carlos Orellana		
Tito Renaldo		
Emma Roldán		
Andrés Soler		
Arturo Soto Rangel

External links
 

1944 films
1940s Spanish-language films
Mexican black-and-white films
Mexican drama films
1944 drama films
1940s Mexican films